The silver rasbora (Rasbora argyrotaenia) is a species of ray-finned fish in the genus Rasbora. It occurs in the Mekong, Chao Phraya and Mae Klong basins, Malay Peninsula as well as Borneo, Java and Sumatra.

References 

Rasboras
Fish of the Mekong Basin
Fauna of Brunei
Fish of Cambodia
Fish of Thailand
Freshwater fish of Malaysia
Freshwater fish of Indonesia
Taxa named by Pieter Bleeker
Fish described in 1849
Freshwater fish of Borneo